Norvin Green State Forest is a  state forest in Bloomingdale, New Jersey, United States, near the Wanaque Reservoir. It is part of the Northeastern coastal forests ecoregion. The forest is accessible by foot only; it is part of the Wyanokie Wilderness Area and contains an extensive trail system built on old logging roads, several of which connect with trails in The New Weis Center and reservoir property. The park is operated and maintained by the New Jersey Division of Parks and Forestry.

See also

 List of New Jersey state parks
 Highlands Natural Pool

References

External links

 The New Weis Center for Education, Arts & Recreation
 North Jersey District Water Supply Commission
 Snake Den Road, Local community web site.
 NY-NJTC: Norvin Green State Forest Trail Details and Info

Green State Forest
Green State Forest
State forests of the Appalachians